Mathil is a 2021 Indian Tamil-language drama film directed by Mithran R. Jawahar and produced by Singa Sankaran under the production house SS Group. The film stars K. S. Ravikumar, Mime Gopi and Madhumita. The film was digitally released on ZEE5 on 14 April 2021. Written by Jothi Arunachalam and Ezhichur Aravindan, the cinematography and film editing were handled by G. Balamurugan and M. Thiyagarajan.

Plot 
Lakshmikanthan (K. S. Ravikumar), a theater artist who is enjoying his retired life, is a happy man now as his long dream of owning a home comes true. As someone who has seen his father's struggles without having a home, he is so attached with the newly-built home and shares the same with his daughter, son, and daughter-in-law. But little does he know that his happiness will be short-lived. One day, a few goons who work for Senathipathi (Mime Gopi), a dreaded politician in the locality, paint their party symbol on Lakshmi's house wall. Upon complaining to the nearby sub-inspector (Srinath), a miffed Sena uses his influence and ensures that the power supply to Lakshmi's house is cut off. Lakshmi's friends restore power supply in a far-fetched but partly enjoyable scene, and this irks Sena again. He, in return, destroys his house wall, after which both of them declare war against each other. Lakshmi is a middle-class common man who hardly has any influence, while Sena, on the other hand, is close to being chosen by his party as the MLA candidate. Whether Lakshmi and his drama troupe are able to succeed in this battle against Sena forms the rest of the story.

Cast 

 K. S. Ravikumar as Lakshmikanthan
 Mime Gopi as Senathipathi
 Shanjith as Vinoth
 Lollu Sabha Swaminathan as Ganesan
 Madhumitha
 Dhivya Duraisamy as Shanmathi
 Srinath as Sub-Inspector
 Aathreyaa as Hacker
 Raja Simman
 Kathadi Ramamurthy

Release 
The film was digitally released on 14 April 2021 on ZEE5.

References

External links 

 

2021 films
2021 drama films
2020s Tamil-language films
ZEE5 original films
2021 direct-to-video films
Films directed by Mithran R. Jawahar